The Indian Powerplus is a motorcycle that was built from 1916 to 1924 by the Hendee Manufacturing Company.  Designed by Charles Gustafson, the Powerplus's engine was Indian's first flathead.

Origin
Charles Gustafson left Reading Standard in 1909 and joined Indian as Oscar Hedstrom's assistant. Gustafson had designed side valve "flathead" engines for Reading Standard, which had been the first motorcycle manufacturer in the United States to use a flathead engine in a production motorcycle. When Hedstrom left Indian in 1913, Gustafson became Indian's chief engineer.

In late 1915, Indian introduced Gustafson's replacement for Hedstrom's  V-twin engine. The new engine used side valves instead of the inlet-over-exhaust (IOE) valve layout used in Hedstrom's designs. The flathead engine was quieter and less expensive to manufacture than the earlier IOE engine and needed less maintenance.

The new engine was installed in the existing frames for Indian V-twin motorcycles, and used existing drivetrain components, tanks, handlebars, and other components. The drive train included a clutch, a kickstarter, and a three-speed gearbox.

The standard frame for the Powerplus had a conventional rigid rear wheel mounting, but the Powerplus was also available with Indian's Cradle Spring Frame. Introduced in 1913, the Cradle Spring Frame had a rear swingarm linked to trailing leaf springs.

Controls

The Powerplus had twist grips on both handles; the throttle was controlled by the left twist grip while the right twist grip advanced or retarded the spark.  Three controls were on the right side of the gas tank, a vertically-operated shifter, an exhaust valve lifter, and a hand clutch lever.  The clutch lever was linked to the clutch pedal positioned on the left side of the bike.

Promotion and development
Between 24 and 28 August 1915, Erwin "Cannonball" Baker rode an early Indian Powerplus from Vancouver to Tijuana in 3 days, 9 hours and 15 minutes, establishing a new "Three Flags" record.

The Powerplus engine was revised in 1917 with the barrels and pistons lengthened by a quarter of an inch and the piston wrist pin relocated below the piston center.  This was done to reduce the occurrence of piston slap. The valve caps in the cylinder head were finned from 1917 until the end of production.

End of production
Production of the larger Powerplus engine ended in 1922, the year in which production of the Powerplus's eventual successor, the Chief, began production.  The Powerplus was renamed the "Standard" in 1922, reflecting the fact that it was not as powerful as the Chief.

The Standard was discontinued in 1923, and the Cradle Spring Frame was discontinued with it. Indian would not offer rear suspension on a production motorcycle again until 1940, when the Chief and the Four would be given plunger suspension.

References
Citations

Sources

Powerplus
Motorcycles introduced in the 1910s
Motorcycles powered by V engines
Vehicles introduced in 1916
Standard motorcycles